Prasophyllum alpinum, commonly known as the alpine leek orchid, is a species of orchid endemic to Tasmania. It was formerly described as occurring in mainland Australia but has smaller flowers than the species occurring there. It has a single, tube-shaped leaf and up to fourteen green to greenish-brown flowers and grows in subalpine areas.

Description
As with others in the genus, the flowers are inverted so that the labellum is above the column rather than below it. Flowering occurs from December to January.

Taxonomy and naming
Prasophyllum alpinum was first formally described in 1810 by Robert Brown and the description was published in Prodromus Florae Novae Hollandiae et Insulae Van Diemen.  The specific epithet (alpinum) is a Latin word meaning "of high mountains".

Prasophyllum colensoi from New Zealand and P. tadgellianum and P. sphacelatum from mainland Australia were formerly included with P. alpinum.

Distribution and habitat

References

alpinum
Endemic flora of Tasmania
Endemic orchids of Australia
Plants described in 1810